Aelurillus hirtipes is a species of jumping spider in the genus Aelurillus that is found in North Africa. The male was first identified in 1960 and the female in 2006.

References

Salticidae
Spiders of Africa
Spiders described in 1960